Sphenomorphus sanana  is a species of skink found in Indonesia.

References

sanana
Reptiles described in 1926
Taxa named by Felix Kopstein